The Taurus PT92 is a double action/single action, double-stack-magazine
fed, short recoil-operated, semi-automatic 9mm pistol manufactured by Taurus in the  Beretta factory in São Paulo, Brazil.

History and creation
In 1974, a large contract for the Beretta 92 was issued by the Brazilian army, for which Beretta set up a factory in São Paulo,  Brazil. This factory was later sold to the Brazilian gunmaker Taurus (Forjas Taurus S/A) in 1980, after the contract had expired. Shortly thereafter, Taurus closed down the factory and transferred the original Beretta machinery to its factory in Porto Alegre, Rio Grande do Sul, using it to make its own pistol, which was a copy of the original Beretta 92 design, no longer being produced in Brazil. They did this without the need for a license and they also did not have to pay royalties, as the designs and patents had since expired.

Design
Like the Beretta, the Taurus PT92 utilizes the open-slide design where the upper portion of the slide is cut away exposing much of the barrel itself. The original PT92 was, in most respects, exactly like the original Beretta 92, though it was also unusual for the time in that it featured a squared trigger guard for supporting the index finger of the opposite hand while firing, a feature which was subsequently introduced to the Beretta 92 with the 92SB-F (92F) model in 1985. The Taurus PT92 is less expensive than the Beretta 92 in most cases.

The Taurus PT92 has undergone many revisions in design since it was originally produced in the early 1980s. Originally, very early models of the PT92 (made between 1982 and 1983) were near-exact copies of the original Beretta 92, featuring the non-ambidextrous safety, round trigger guard and, most notably, the magazine release in the heel of the shiny plastic grips. However, this design was soon replaced with the release button at the base of the trigger guard, the current industry's most common magazine catch location. Nonetheless, aftermarket magazines for the Taurus PT92/Beretta 92 often have cuts for both magazine releases. Early PT92s and PT99s did not feature the third safety position decocker that is now standard; this feature was added to the second-generation models in the early 1990s, which also included the three-dot sights found on the Beretta 92F. A third revision in the late 90s changed the grip and slide design (which now has wider cocking serrations than PT92s manufactured before 1997).

More recently (as of 2005), Taurus has begun manufacturing the PT92 with a thicker trigger guard hook and built-in accessory rails on the frame, a feature found on the newer Beretta M9A1, a military upgrade of the Beretta 92 from which the PT92 is derived. While 15-round magazines were standard for the PT92 for many years, Taurus now manufactures 17-round magazines for the gun in order to give it comparable firepower to the Glock 17, and aftermarket 30-round magazines are also available. Despite the many design changes, the Taurus PT92 still retains many of the design elements from the original Beretta 92, such as the shape of the trigger. Other versions of the PT92 include the PT99, which has an adjustable rear sight and a taller front sight, the compact PT92C, and the PT100 and PT101, which are .40 S&W versions of the PT92 and PT99, respectively.

Variants

7.65mm (.32 auto) (discontinued) 
 PT57, described as a "small brother" to the PT92, the PT57 is chambered in .32 ACP (Auto) and has a magazine capacity of 12+1.(discontinued)

.380 ACP
 PT58, compact model chambered in .380 ACP and has a capacity of 19+1.
 PT59, full-sized model chambered in .380 ACP and has a capacity of 19+1.

9mm Parabellum
 PT92, blued finish, hardwood or black plastic grips, three-dot fixed sights; 10, 15, or 17-round factory magazines available. (discontinued)
 PT92AF, blued finish, lightweight alloy frame, polished stainless steel slide, decocker, frame-mounted accessory rail, five-inch barrel, hardwood grips, three-dot fixed sights. 17-round magazine. (A = ambidextrous safety lever; F = firing pin lock.)
 PT92AFS, lightweight alloy frame, polished stainless steel slide, decocker, frame-mounted accessory rail, five-inch barrel, hardwood grips, three-dot fixed sights. 17-round magazine. (A = ambidextrous safety lever; F = firing pin lock; S = Stainless Version.) (discontinued)
 PT92SS, stainless steel finish, checkered black rubber grip panels, three-dot fixed sights. Ten, 15, and 17-round factory magazines available.(discontinued)
 PT92C, Compact model with four-inch barrel, hardwood or black plastic grips, three-dot fixed sights. 12-round factory magazines available.(discontinued)
 PT99, blued or satin nickel finish, hardwood or black plastic grips, adjustable rear sight. All PT99 variants are compatible with PT92 magazines.(discontinued)
 PT99AF, blued or satin nickel finish, hardwood or black plastic grips, lightweight alloy frame, 4.75-inch barrel, adjustable rear sight. (discontinued)
 PT917C, Compact version with four-inch barrel, blued finish, alloy frame, three-dot fixed sights. 17 and 19-round factory magazines available. The 19-round magazine extends one inch below the grip.
 PT917CS, Compact version with four-inch barrel, stainless steel finish, alloy frame, three-dot fixed sights. 17 and 19-round factory magazines available. The 19-round magazine extends one inch below the grip. It ships with both a 17 and 19-round factory magazine.(discontinued)

.40 Smith & Wesson
 PT100, .40 S&W version with 3-dot fixed sights. 10- or 11-round factory magazines available.
 PT101, .40 S&W version with an adjustable rear sight, compatible with PT100 magazines. (discontinued)

Users

: PT92 and PT917, in some detachments can be used a standard sidearm of "Policía de la Provincia de Buenos Aires" since 2009.
: PT92, standard sidearm of the Brazilian Army, Military Police and National Public Security Force. It is designated as M975 pistol in military service troops.
: Used by Carabineros de Chile.

: Mishteret Y’Israel, Israeli Civilian Police of Jerusalem District were issued the Taurus PT92C 

: Gradually withdrawn from service being replaced by Glock Models as the standard side arm of the Army and Police
: PT92AFD and PT92AFD-M, standard sidearm of the Peruvian Army, Special Forces.

References

External links
 Official United States site
 Unsung Best Buy: A Critical Look at the Taurus PT-92
 PT917C 

Police weapons
Semi-automatic pistols of Brazil
9mm Parabellum semi-automatic pistols
.32 ACP semi-automatic pistols
.380 ACP semi-automatic pistols
.40 S&W semi-automatic pistols
Weapons and ammunition introduced in 1983